This is a list of Australian Football League season disposal (kicks and handballs combined) leaders.

Multiple Leaders

References
Detailed Player Stats; accessed 27 August 2013

Season disposal leaders
Australian rules football-related lists